Ernesford Grange is a suburb of Coventry, West Midlands. It is in the southeast of the city and borders the Binley, Stoke Aldermoor and Willenhall areas. It is part of the Coventry South Constituency. The district was built in the 1960s and the 1970s.

It is served by four primary schools, the Ernesford Grange Community Academy, and Corpus Christi church. There is also a leisure centre with an 18 metre long swimming pool.

Many of the streets are named after miners who worked in the coal pits, which used to cover most of the area.

External links
Ernesford Grange Leisure Centre

Suburbs of Coventry
Housing estates in England